2-Methyloctane is a branched alkane hydrocarbon with the chemical formula C9H20. It is a colorless, flammable liquid

Combustion reactions
2-Methyloctane burns in the same way as other alkanes. Where there is enough oxygen, nonane burns to form water and carbon dioxide, so 2-methyloctane would do the same.

C9H20 + 14O2 → 9CO2 + 10H2O

When insufficient oxygen is present for complete combustion, carbon monoxide is produced.

2C9H20 + 19O2 → 18CO + 20H2O

See also
List of isomers of nonane

References

Alkanes